CJSO-FM is a French language hot adult contemporary radio station that operates at 101.7 FM in Sorel-Tracy, Quebec, Canada.

The station originally began as an AM station in 1945, initially at 1400 kHz, later moving to 1320, until it received CRTC approval to move to the FM band in 1987.

CJSO is owned by Radiodiffusion Sorel-Tracy.

References

External links
Official website CJSO 101,7 La radio du Bas-Richelieu
 

Jso
Jso
Jso
Sorel-Tracy
Radio stations established in 1945
1945 establishments in Quebec